Michelle Molineux (born October 1, 1990) is a Canadian actress and singer. She was born in Edmonton, Alberta, Canada and attended the University of Alberta. Molineux is best known for her role as an alien seductress in Decoys 2: Alien Seduction released in 2006.

Some of Molineux's other credits include playing Tara, a haunting siren in "The Sacrifice", Sally in The Pharmacist, and Claire in Love/Hate. Molineux is also a voice-over artist working with Blue Water Studios on English dubs of anime. She is known for voicing Hannah in the English dub of Futari wa Pretty Cure.

Filmography

Live-action roles 
 The Manikin (Short) (2006)   – Helen
 Decoys 2: Alien Seduction (2007) – Delia, The Beautiful Alien Seductress
Fear Itself – episode "The Sacrifice" (2008) – Tara
 The Pharmacist (2010)   – Sally
 Love/Hate (2011)   – Claire
 Nightmare Island 2: Hookface's Revenge (2011–2012)   – Suzy

Voice roles 
 Futari wa Pretty Cure – Hannah Whitehouse/Cure White
 Deltora Quest – Francoise
 Viper's Creed – Megumu
 Cardfight!! Vanguard – Rekka
 Scan2Go – Fiona
 The Star, Moon, Sun, and Heart- Sophie Walker
 The Turn of The Blue Moon- Lisette and Celestia Anderson
 The New Adventures of Peter Pan – Tinker Bell
 World Trigger - Haruka Ayatsuji, Ichinose

References

External links 
 
 
 

Living people
Actresses from Edmonton
Canadian film actresses
Canadian voice actresses
Franco-Albertan people
1990 births